St  Nathy’s College is a secondary school based in Ballaghaderreen, Roscommon. It is the diocesan college for the Diocese of Achonry. It is one of the oldest secondary schools in Ireland, having been founded in 1810. The School was located from 1893-96 in Edmundstown House, the former residence of the Bishop. The Diocese purchased Ballaghaderreen Military Barracks from the War Office, and the School moved there in 1896.
In 1995 the school ceased to be a boarding school.
St. Nathys amalgamated with St. Josephs Convent (Sisters of Charity) becoming a co-educational school, it also amalgamated with the local Ballaghaderreen VEC school

2010 saw the celebration of 200 years of the college, St Nathy’s 1810 to 2010, Reflections and Memories of Past Pupils, edited by Fr. Leo Henry, was published as part of the celebrations.

Alumni
 Most Rev. Thomas Flynn, Bishop of Achonry and a former teacher at the school
 Most Rev. Dr. Laurence Gillooly CM, Bishop of Elphin
 Claire Kerrane, TD for Roscommon-Galway elected 2020
 Prof. Thomas Noel Mitchell, the second Catholic provost of Trinity College Dublin(1991-2001)
 Patsy McGarry, Irish Times Correspondent
 Most Rev. Thomas McGettrick SPS, missionary priest and Bishop of Abakaliki, Nigeria
 Ted Nealon, former TD and minister of state
 William O'Dwyer, 100th Mayor of New York City

Presidents of the College
 Canon Hugh O'Donnell (1911-1920)
 Fr. Thomas Curneen
 Fr. Thomas Fleming (  - 1965)
 Fr. Thomas Flynn
 Fr. Robert Flynn (1977 - 1978)
 Fr. James Colleran ( - 1982)
 Fr. Andrew Johnston (1982- )
 Fr. Martin Convey (1996-2011)
 Fr. Tomás Surlis DD (2011-2017), served as Principal and President.
 Mr. Declan Dunne (2017- 2022), first lay Principal of the College.
Fr. Martin Henry

References

External links
http://stnathys.com/

Educational institutions established in 1810
Catholic secondary schools in the Republic of Ireland
1810 establishments in Ireland
Secondary schools in County Roscommon
Roman Catholic Diocese of Achonry